The Getty Ministry was the combined Cabinet (called Executive Council of Alberta), chaired by Premier Don Getty, and Ministers that governed Alberta from the mid-point of the 20th Alberta Legislature from November 1, 1985, to nearly the end of the 22nd Alberta Legislature until December 14, 1992.

The Executive Council (commonly known as the cabinet) was made up of members of the Progressive Conservative Party of Alberta which held a majority of seats in the Legislative Assembly of Alberta. The cabinet was appointed by the Lieutenant Governor of Alberta on the advice of the Premier.

List of ministers

See also
Executive Council of Alberta
List of Alberta provincial ministers

References 

 

Politics of Alberta
Executive Council of Alberta
1985 establishments in Alberta
1992 disestablishments in Alberta
Cabinets established in 1985
Cabinets disestablished in 1992